Luis Felipe Rabelo Costa (born 18 February 2002), commonly known as Pará, is a Brazilian footballer who plays as a midfielder for Juventude.

Club career
Pará was born in Marituba, Pará, and joined Juventude's youth setup in 2017, aged fifteen. In the 2019 and 2020 seasons, he also spent time on loan with the under-20 side of Bahia.

Upon returning, Pará featured for the under-20 and under-23 squads of Ju before making his first team – and Série A – debut on 29 August 2022, by coming on as a second-half substitute for Elton in a 4–0 away loss against Internacional.

Career statistics

References

External links
Juventude profile 

2002 births
Living people
Sportspeople from Pará
Brazilian footballers
Association football midfielders
Campeonato Brasileiro Série A players
Esporte Clube Juventude players